Diversity Explosion: How New Racial Demographics are Remaking America is a 2014 non-fiction book by William H. Frey.

A look into how racial and ethnic diversity and changing demographics are altering the United States, Diversity Explosion is published and distributed by the Brookings Institution Press.

Frey is a senior fellow at the Brookings Institution Metropolitan Policy Program.

References

External links
Brookings

2014 non-fiction books
English-language books
Books about race and ethnicity
Books about the United States
American non-fiction books
Demographics of the United States
Race in the United States
Demography books